New Leaves is the fifth studio album by Chicago artist Mike Kinsella under the name Owen.

Background and release
On February 13, 2009, "New Leaves" was posted on Owen's Myspace account. It was mentioned that Owen was in process of writing and demoing for their next album. On July 23, 2009, New Leaves was announced for release in two months' time. Alongside this, the album's artwork and track listing was posted online. On September 16, 2009, a music video was released for "Good Friends, Bad Habits". New Leaves was released on September 22, 2009, on Polyvinyl Records.

Track listing

References

2009 albums
Owen (musician) albums
Polyvinyl Record Co. albums